The 2003 South Dakota tornado outbreak produced an all-time one-day record for most tornadoes in South Dakota with 67 on June 24, 2003 and a total of 95 tornadoes across five states on that day. It was a part of a four-day event which produced a total of 125 tornadoes from Wyoming to Minnesota from June 21 to June 24. While there were no fatalities on June 24, one person was killed on June 22 and another on June 23, both in Nebraska.

Tornado Table

Confirmed tornadoes

June 21 event

June 22 event

June 23 event

June 24 event

See also

 List of North American tornadoes and tornado outbreaks

External links
 NCDC Storm Events

Tornadoes of 2003
Tornadoes in Minnesota
Tornadoes in Nebraska
Tornadoes in South Dakota